At least two warships of Japan have been named Setoshio:

, a  launched in 1981 and struck in 2001
, an  launched in 2007

Japanese Navy ship names
Japan Maritime Self-Defense Force ship names